Fosby is the administrative centre of Aremark, Norway. Its population in 2005 is 318.

Villages in Østfold
Aremark